Kishanpur Yusuf is a village in Samastipur taluk, in Samastipur District in the state of Bihar, India.

Kishanpur Yusuf is surrounded by Raipur in east, Rasalpur in west, Khalishpur in North and Mohiuddin Nagar in south. The main occupation is farming.

This village has a rich cultural heritage. Alia pir baba is one of them. Here devotees come every year to pray in a large number.
Kishanpur Yusuf is also known for its Middle school which is basically a good source of education for poor people or the person who does not afford to pay for the education of children.

The village consists of mainly 2 religion i.e Hindu and Muslim.

References 

Villages in Samastipur district